The British Superbike Championship (BSB), currently known for sponsorship reasons as the Bennetts British Superbike Championship, is the leading road racing superbike championship in the United Kingdom, and is still acknowledged to be the premier domestic superbike racing series in the world.

The championship is managed and organised by MotorSport Vision, who also own many of the circuits the series meets at. The Series and Race Director is Stuart Higgs, with event marshals provided by the Racesafe Marshals Association.

The series typically races over twelve rounds from April to October, with the series concluding in a three-round 'Showdown,' where the top six riders are awarded points based on their podium finishes from the previous nine rounds and then compete over three rounds and seven races for the title. The Showdown format was introduced in 2010 in order to prevent a rider from making a runaway victory in the championship.

From 2008, the championship followed the Superbike World Championship in appointing Pirelli as the single control tyre supplier.

History

The British Superbike Championship began in 1988, with bikes conforming to 750cc TT Formula I regulations, which the championship used through to 1993, when Superbike regulations were adopted.

Niall Mackenzie was the most successful rider of the 1990s, with three titles. Other past champions include Neil Hodgson, Australian Troy Bayliss and Steve Hislop. Chris 'the Stalker' Walker has finished as runner up 4 times. Many riders from the series have gone on to race in the Superbike World Championship or MotoGP.

The 2006 British Superbike Championship was won by Ryuichi Kiyonari, in what was one of the most exciting climaxes to a British Superbike season in years. Kiyonari fought off the challenge of Ducati powered Leon Haslam and Gregorio Lavilla at the final round in Brands Hatch in front of a capacity crowd and a reported 1.5 million live TV viewers, with Kiyonari and Haslam each winning one race, and Lavilla crashing and having an engine problem in both races.

The 2009 British Superbike Championship was mainly dominated by the Yamaha of Leon Camier who set a new record of 14 race wins in a season at event eight of twelve, such was his domination of the championship, beating the previous record of 13 by Niall Mackenzie in the 1997 season. Guintoli, Brookes and Richards all missed races, allowing Stuart Easton of Hydrex Honda and Simon Andrews of MSS Colchester Kawasaki to challenge.
It was claimed that BSB was the biggest supported British racing series,During 2009, 368,000 people attended BSB events across the country and 8,000,000 fans watched 310 hours of television on the live Eurosport and delayed ITV coverage

For 2010, the Privateers cup was replaced by the Evolution Class. MSVR stated that "It will be open to anyone in the series from the official manufacturer-backed teams through to independent entries and will allow homologated machines with full Superbike racing rolling chassis to retain the very important visual impression but engines will have to be built to very stringent "Stock" regulations. Along with standard engines a series specified control ECU device that eliminates any form of traction control, launch control and anti-wheelie devices will be compulsory"

Qualifying was also altered, with the "Roll for Pole" only setting the grid for race one of each weekend. This is due to the race two grid being set by the fastest laps of each rider in race one. Also introduced is a "second chance" system if a rider crashes on lap one, that rider will only drop eight places from where they started the first race. At the pair of triple-race meetings, the same rules apply for race two, but will also be applied for race three.

Playoff Era (2010–present)

Perhaps the biggest rule change was the dividing of the championship into two parts, similar to the system used in two major automobile racing series in the United States – the NASCAR Playoffs, and National Hot Rod Association's Countdown to the Championship.

The first nine meetings (19 races) form the "Main Season" of the championship, before the final three meetings (seven races) make up "The Showdown". The championship change has been introduced after Leon Camier clinched the 2009 title with four races to spare, thus introducing a crescendo of competition.

The normal FIM point-scoring system still applies, with 25 for the winner and a single point for 15th. At the end of the Main Season, all riders then drop their two worst scores, which must be from events they have at least qualified for. From this points order, the first six riders in the championship standings will be elevated to a new base level and become the Title Fighters for the final three events and seven races of the championship.

The playoff format is similar to the 2007-10 NASCAR Playoff format used in their premiership, based on a six-rider format, but offering bonus points for any finish first to third, unlike NASCAR's format which only rewards wins.  Each Title Fighter will start The Showdown with 500 points, plus additional points for each podium position they have obtained in the Main Season; 3 for a win, 2 for a second, and 1 for a third, termed "Podium Credits". Using the first nineteen races of Camier's 2009 campaign, Camier would have had 547 points due to his fifteen wins and a second place out of the first nineteen races of the season.

The standard points scoring format from the Main Season then continues for The Showdown, with all points scores from the final seven races counting. All riders outside of the Title Fighters continue to race for the BSB Riders' Cup, continuing to add to their points total from the end of the Main Season. This also applies to the new Evolution class.

For the 2012 season, MSVR announced a number of changes to the technical regulations to enhance the spectacle of the British Superbike Championship. The championship was to be limited to 32 entries, 16 two-bike teams. This was intended to be a way to reward the teams that have raced in BSB, year in, year out. Teams within the current BSB were invited to enter their two bike teams initially, with teams who wish to graduate to the BSB class having to buy an entry.

For the 2014 season, the playoff bonus points system was changed. Riders earned five points for a win, three points for second, and one point for third.

For the 2021 season, the playoff system was adjusted again.  Eight riders, up from six, will now compete in the playoff.

Circuits
Being a national championship, the British Superbike Championship has visited circuits throughout the United Kingdom, as well as European venues, over its history. In 2014, the series visits nine different tracks in England, Scotland and the Netherlands. These tracks are: Brands Hatch, Oulton Park, Snetterton Motor Racing Circuit, Knockhill Racing Circuit, Thruxton Circuit, Cadwell Park, Donington Park, TT Circuit Assen and Silverstone Circuit.

In the past, the BSB has visited Croft Circuit, Mallory Park and Rockingham Motor Speedway in England, Mondello Park in Ireland and Pembrey Circuit in Wales.

Types of motorcycles used
Superbike racing motorcycles are derived from standard production models. In the past, however, manufacturers took advantage of loopholes in the rules to create "homologation specials" — motorcycles with low production numbers made especially for racing.

Motorcycles that raced in the British Superbike Championship include:
 BMW Motorrad: BMW S1000RR (currently)
 Ducati: Ducati 916/955, Ducati 996 RS, Ducati 998 RS, Ducati 998 F02,  Ducati 999 F04, Ducati 1098, Ducati 1199, Ducati Panigale V4 (currently)
 Honda: RC30, RC45, RC51, CBR1000RR (currently)
 Kawasaki: ZXR750, ZX-7RR, ZX-10R, ZX-10RR Ninja (currently)
 Suzuki: GSX-R750, GSX-R1000 (currently)
 Yamaha: FZR750, YZF750, YZF-R7, YZF-R1 (currently)
Withdrawn motorcycles
 MV Agusta: MV Agusta F4
 Norton: Norton rotary F1
 KTM: KTM 1190 RC8

Race weekend

 For 2010 a change to the qualifying system means that riders will only "qualify" for race one, (or race one and two if it is a 3 race weekend). The grid for the other race will be decided by the fastest lap in the previous race.

Support classes

Currently, the BSB is supported by four main support series. These being:
The British Supersport Championship: acting as a lower division of the main BSB
The National Superstock 1000 Championship
The National Superstock 600 Championship
The British Motostar Championship

TV coverage
The move to ITV vastly increased the viewing figures by a reported 450% over the figures for 2005.
During the 2006 season ITV1's BSB coverage attracted an average UK adult audience of 962,000 per round with a peak audience of more than 1.5 million for the cliff-hanger final leg at Brands Hatch

Races were covered live by ITV and Sky Sports. Over the twelve BSB rounds, the 'live' ITV1 coverage attracted an average adult audience of some 11,552,000, which equates to an average viewership of 962,000 per round and 10.68% audience share with 317,100 attending the twelve rounds, with 270,000 viewers on "delayed" Sky Sports transmission

For the 2008 championship, the series was now live on British Eurosport, with highlights on Channel 4 within the next few days. This was a step down from where the BSB had previously been having an effect on the viewing figuresThe total UK BSB TV audience in 2008 was 7 million compared to 11 million in 2007 – which averages at 600,000 per round which was basically split 50:50 between Eurosport and Channel 4

Scoring system

British Superbike Champions

References

External links
 britishsuperbike.com Official website

 
British Superbike Championship
British Superbike Championship
British Superbike Championship
1988 establishments in the United Kingdom
Recurring sporting events established in 1988
National championships in the United Kingdom